The 2009 Indonesia Open Superseries was the sixth tournament of 2009 BWF Superseries badminton tournament. It was held from 16 to 21 June 2009 in Jakarta, Indonesia. Bolded names below indicate champions.

Men's singles

Seeds
 Lee Chong Wei (champion)
 Peter Gade (second round)
 Lin Dan (quarter-finals)
 Sony Dwi Kuncoro (semi-finals)
 Taufik Hidayat (final)
 Chen Jin (semi-finals)
 Joachim Persson (second round)
 Simon Santoso (second round)

Finals

Top half

Section 1

Section 2

Bottom half

Section 3

Section 4

Women's singles

Seeds

 Zhou Mi (first round)
 Wang Yihan (quarter-finals)
 Wang Lin (final)
 Wang Chen (second round)
 Pi Hongyan (first round)
 Saina Nehwal (champions)
 Lu Lan (semi-finals)
 Xie Xingfang (semi-finals)

Finals

Top half

Section 1

Section 2

Bottom half

Section 3

Section 4

Men's doubles

Seeds

 Markis Kido / Hendra Setiawan (semi-finals)
 Mathias Boe / Carsten Mogensen (withdrew)
 Koo Kien Keat / Tan Boon Heong (semi-finals)
 Mohd Zakry Abdul Latif / Mohd Fairuzizuan Mohd Tazari (quarter-finals)
 Fu Haifeng / Cai Yun (final)
 Jung Jae Sung / Lee Yong-dae (champions)
 Mohammad Ahsan / Bona Septano (first round)
 Choong Tan Fook / Lee Wan Wah (first round)

Finals

Top half

Section 1

Section 2

Bottom half

Section 3

Section 4

Women's doubles

Seeds

 Chin Eei Hui / Wong Pei Tty (champions)
 Cheng Shu / Zhao Yunlei (final)
 Cheng Wen Hsing / Chien Yu Chin (semifinals)
 Ha Jung-eun / Kim Min-jung (semifinals)
Blank
 Zhang Yawen / Zhao Tingting (quarterfinals)
 Lee Kyung-won / Lee Hyo-jung (quarterfinals)
 Shendy Puspa Irawati / Meiliana Jauhari (withdrew)

Finals

Top half
Section 1

Section 2

Bottom half
Section 3

Section 4

Mixed doubles
Seeds

 Nova Widianto / Liliyana Natsir (quarterfinals) Lee Yong-dae / Lee Hyo-jung (final) He Hanbin / Yu Yang (withdrew) Thomas Laybourn / Kamilla Rytter Juhl (semifinals) Zheng Bo / Ma Jin (champion)
 Xie Zhongbo / Zhang Yawen (quarterfinals) Joachim Fischer Nielsen / Christinna Pedersen (semifinals) Sudket Prapakamol / Saralee Thungthongkam (withdrew)Finals

Top half
Section 1

Section 2

Bottom half
Section 3

Section 4

External links
Indonesia Super Series 2009 at tournamentsoftware.com''

Indonesia Super Series, 2009
Indonesia Open (badminton)
Open Super Series
Sports competitions in Jakarta
Indonesia